was released on December 1, 2010, as the comeback album of Japanese duo Pink Lady. Released as a 2-CD set, the album features re-recorded versions of single releases, b-sides and well known songs.

Track listing 
All lyrics are written by Yū Aku, except where indicated; all music is composed and arranged by Shunichi Tokura, except where indicated.

Charts

References

External links
 (CD)
 (Digital)

2010 albums
Japanese-language albums
Pink Lady (band) albums
Self-covers albums
Victor Entertainment albums